The 25th Japan Record Awards were given in a ceremony held on December 31, 1983. They recognized accomplishments by musicians from that year.

Award winners 
Japan Record Award:
Takashi Hosokawa for "Yagiri no Watashi"
Best Vocalist:
Masako Mori
Best New Artist:
The Good-Bye

External links
Official Website

Japan Record Awards
Japan Record Awards
Japan Record Awards
Japan Record Awards
1983